Earlington may refer to:

Earlington, Kentucky, United States
Earlington, Pennsylvania, United States
Earlington, West Hill, a neighborhood of Bryn Mawr-Skyway, Washington, United States
Earlington Heights station, a Metrorail station in Brownsville, Miami-Dade County, Florida, United States

See also
Eardington, Shropshire, England
Earling (disambiguation)